Wild West Alaska is an American reality television series. The series premiered on January 13, 2013, on Animal Planet. The series is filmed in Anchorage, Alaska, where it chronicles the daily activities at the Wild West Guns gun shop.

Series overview

Episodes

Season 1 (2013)

Season 2 (2014)

Season 3 (2015)

Season 4 (2016)

References

External links
 

2010s American reality television series
2013 American television series debuts
Animal Planet original programming
Television shows set in Alaska
Television shows about weaponry